Christian Montanari (born 21 June 1981) is a former racing car driver from San Marino.

Results summary

Career summary

Complete Formula Renault 3.5 Series results
(key) (Races in bold indicate pole position) (Races in italics indicate fastest lap)

24 Hours of Le Mans results

External links
 

1981 births
Living people
Sammarinese racing drivers
Italian racing drivers
Auto GP drivers
Italian Formula Renault 2.0 drivers
Formula Renault Eurocup drivers
Formula Renault V6 Eurocup drivers
Italian Formula Three Championship drivers
A1 Grand Prix Rookie drivers
International Formula 3000 drivers
24 Hours of Le Mans drivers
24 Hours of Daytona drivers
European Le Mans Series drivers
World Series Formula V8 3.5 drivers
Superstars Series drivers
24 Hours of Spa drivers
Draco Racing drivers
Prema Powerteam drivers

AF Corse drivers
Victory Engineering drivers
Scuderia Coloni drivers